Aleksandr Vitalyevich Galakhov (born 3 December 1981) is a former Russian professional football player.

Club career
He played in the Russian Football National League for FC Mordovia Saransk in 2004.

References

External links
 Career summary by sportbox.ru
 

1981 births
Living people
Russian footballers
Association football defenders
FC Lada-Tolyatti players
FC Mordovia Saransk players
FC Mashuk-KMV Pyatigorsk players